John Henry Kuck (April 27, 1905 – September 21, 1986) was an American athlete who won a gold medal in the shot put at the 1928 Summer Olympics setting a new world record at 15.87 m. Earlier that year he set two more world records, but they were not recognized officially. In 1926 he also set a US record in the javelin throw at 65.28 m and won the AAU title.

References

 
 John Kuck. kshof.org

1905 births
1986 deaths
People from Ellsworth County, Kansas
Track and field athletes from Kansas
American male shot putters
Olympic gold medalists for the United States in track and field
Athletes (track and field) at the 1928 Summer Olympics
World record setters in athletics (track and field)
Medalists at the 1928 Summer Olympics